Betafo is a district in Vakinankaratra Region, Madagascar. The administrative centre of the district is the town of Betafo. However the district has subsequently been divided by the creation of the new Mandoto District from former parts of Betafo District. The reduced district covers an area of 4,607 km, and it had an estimated population of 331,696 in 2018. It is situated at 22 km west of Antsirabe.

The irrigated rice paddies of the district are emblematic of this technology throughout the highlands and were nominated to the Tentative List of UNESCO World Heritage Sites in Madagascar in 1997.

Communes
The district is further divided into 18 communes:

 Alakamisy Anativato
 Alakamisy Marososona
 Alarobia Bemaha
 Ambatonikonilahy
 Ambohimanambola
 Ambohimasina
 Andranomafana
 Andrembesoa
 Anosiarivo Manapa
 Antohobe
 Antsoso
 Betafo
 Inanantonana
 Mahaiza
 Mandritsara
 Manohisoa
 Soavina
 Tritriva

Infrastructure
The district is connected by the RN34 national road from Antsirabe (22km) to Morondava..

Lakes
 The Lake Tritriva, a volcanic lake.

References
from

Districts of Vakinankaratra